E. maritimum may refer to:
 Erodium maritimum, the sea storksbill, a plant species in the genus Erodium
 Eryngium maritimum, the sea holly, a plant species in the family Apiaceae

Synonyms
 Echium maritimum, a synonym for Echium sabulicola, the sand viper's gloss, a plant species

See also
 Maritimum (disambiguation)